Primož Kopač (born 25 November 1970 in Žiri) is a Slovenian former ski jumper who competed from 1989 to 1994. At the 1992 Winter Olympics in Albertville, he finished sixth in the team large hill and 26th in the individual normal hill events.

Kopač's best World Cup career finish was 25th in a large hill event in Canada in 1989.

External links

1970 births
Living people
Ski jumpers at the 1992 Winter Olympics
Slovenian male ski jumpers
Olympic ski jumpers of Slovenia
People from Žiri
20th-century Slovenian people